Next Step Football Club is a Cambodian professional association football  club based in Siem Reap province. The club plays in Cambodian League 2.

History

Foundation

Next Step Football Club was founded in 2013 by Charlie Pomroy and Keo Sophal. Originally set up as a not-for-profit football academy, working to help underprivileged children in Cambodia, in 2022 the club joined the Cambodian second tier to participate in its first professional season.

Debut professional season

Next Step Football Club registered as a professional club in July 2021, before making its professional football debut in 2022. The team finished 11th in the league, with Brazilian striker Bruno Krenkel ending the season as the club’s top scorer, logging ten goals – one of those, a long-range wonder strike, which gained global acclaim.

In 2023, former Dorchester Town F.C. manager Callum Brooks joined the club as technical director. Brooks stated that he joined Next Step "to be another body behind a great vision".

Investment in the club

In 2023, Next Step teamed up with recruitment and relocation company Next Step International (NSI) “in a deal which will see the latter help hire, move and adapt the latest quality football talent from around the world” to Cambodia.

References

Football clubs in Cambodia